Christopher Schroeder may refer to:

 Christopher H. Schroeder (born 1948), American lawyer
 Christopher M. Schroeder (born 1964), American entrepreneur